Black Beach, located on the island of Bioko, in the capital city of Malabo in Equatorial Guinea, is one of Africa's most notorious prisons.

History
The prison was built in the 1940s during the time of the Spanish colonial rule. At first common criminals were imprisoned here, but after the independence of the country in 1968 and the establishment of the dictatorship of Francisco Macías Nguema, many political opponents were imprisoned and killed in the prison, including Bonifacio Ondó Edu and Edmundo Bossio.

Reputation
It has a reputation for systematically neglecting and brutalising inmates. Medical treatment is usually denied to inmates and food rations are said to be meager, despite the United Nations' Standard Minimum Rules for the Treatment of Prisoners requiring minimal medical treatment for all prisoners.

Noted individuals linked with the prison

Former governor
The President of Equatorial Guinea, Teodoro Obiang Nguema Mbasogo, is a former Governor of Black Beach Prison. 

His uncle and predecessor, Francisco Macías Nguema, was imprisoned here after he was overthrown in a 1979 coup d'état, and was subsequently executed by firing squad.

Prisoners
Black Beach has held a number of foreign prisoners, mainly mercenaries sentenced for participating in a 2004 coup d'état attempt against the President of Equatorial Guinea, Teodoro Obiang Nguema Mbasogo. These included Nick du Toit and alleged ringleader, Simon Mann, until their presidential pardon on 2 and 3 November 2009 respectively, on humanitarian grounds. Ramón Esono Ebalé spent 6 months in Black Beach until he was released in March 2018 after a police officer admitted to falsely accusing him based on orders from his superiors.

Several people have been jailed there in the over the 40 years of dictatorship. Among those imprisoned and tortured are many political leaders such as Rafael Upiñalo (Movimiento), Fabián Nsue (UP), Felipe Ondo Obiang (FDR), Martín Puye of Movement for the Self-Determination of Bioko Island (MAIB) or Plácido Micó of the Social Democratic Convergence for Social Democracy (CPDS).

References

External links 

 Guillermo Nguema Ela, Donato Ondó Ondó and other detainees in Black Beach prison Amnesty International
 

Bioko
Law of Equatorial Guinea
Prisons in Equatorial Guinea